Geba (Dargwa: Гьеба) is a rural locality (a selo) in Akushinsky District, Republic of Dagestan, Russia. The population was 735 as of 2010. There are 8 streets.

Geography 
Geba is located 13 km southeast of Akusha (the district's administrative centre) by road, on the Dargolakotta River. Kurkimakhi is the nearest rural locality.

References 

Rural localities in Akushinsky District